Lieutenant General Smith Dun  (11 November 1906 – 1979) was the commander-in-chief of the Burmese Army from 4 January 1948 to 1 February 1949. He was an ethnic Karen and the first person belonging to the ethnic group to hold the office.

Dun enlisted in the Indian Army on 8 November 1924, initially with the 10th battalion 20th Burma Rifles and after training served with the 2nd battalion 20th Burma Rifles, seeing service in Burma during the rebellion of 1930-32.

He was commissioned a Viceroy's Commissioned Officer on 10 January 1931. He attended the Kitchener College, Nowgong and from there was later selected to attend the Indian Military Academy and earned the first Sword of Honour which is given to the best cadet of each year’s class. He was commissioned on 1 February 1935, his seniority later being antedated to 4 February 1934. For a year after commissioning he was attached to the 2nd battalion the Kings Own Yorkshire Light Infantry at Agra. On 24 February 1936 he was admitted to the Indian Army and appointed to the 2nd battalion the 1st Punjab Regiment on 9 March 1936. He was promoted Lieutenant on 4 May 1936. His battalion was involved in fighting on the North West Frontier during 1936-37.

During his time at the Indian Military Academy, Dun was selected as part of the first batch of cadets. Called "The Pioneers", his class also produced Sam Maneckshaw and Muhammad Musa Khan, future commanders-in-chief of India and Pakistan, respectively. 

He was serving attached to the Burma Military Police when the Japanese invaded in 1941. For his services on the retreat from Burma he was Mentioned in Despatches (London Gazette 28 October 1942).  He attended the Staff College at Quetta and then saw further service in Burma, receiving another Mention in Despatches (London Gazette 5 April 1945) and later was awarded the Military Cross (London Gazette 17 January 1946) as a temporary Major attached the Burma Intelligence Corps. He was promoted to war-substantive lieutenant-colonel in the Indian Army, to acting colonel on 15 November 1945 and to temporary colonel on 5 May 1946. He retired from the Indian Army on 3 January 1949 as an honorary brigadier.

In a move to build confidence in the Burmese Union that would include all ethnic groups, Dun, a Karen, was appointed commander-in-chief of the Burmese army and of the police forces when Burma gained its independence from Britain following World War II. However, in 1949 when the Karen began their war for independence from Burma, Dun was removed from his position. Dun was a loyal leader of the Burmese Army while maintaining a strong sense of his Karen ethnicity. Known as the "four-foot colonel" for his small stature, he kept his Karen soldiers disciplined although suspicion of his ethnic roots lingered even after his dismissal.

See also
Indian Army
Military of Myanmar

References

External link
Dun, Smith. Memoirs of the Four-Foot Colonel. Ithaca, NY: Cornell Southeast Asia Program, 1980.

Burmese generals
1906 births
1979 deaths
Burmese people of Karen descent
People from Ayeyarwady Region
Burmese Christians
British Indian Army soldiers
British Indian Army officers
Recipients of the Military Cross